The Writers Association of Korea is a society formed by writers of South Korea to promote Korean literature and support Korean writers.

History

On November 18, 1974, the Council of Writers for Freedom and Practice (hangul: 자유실천문인협의회) was established by a number of writers including Ko Un to protect the rights of writers, and started a campaign to free the poet Kim Ji-ha from imprisonment. 1987, the group was extended to become Association of Writers for National Literature, and then in 2007 it was renamed the Writers Association of Korea.

There are 12 branches and 11 branches nationwide, and it has around 200 members. There are 5 sections such as novels, poetry, poetry, children's literature, and criticism. The office is located in Yonghyeon Building, 50-1 Yonggang-dong, Mapo-gu, Seoul.

The past chairmans are Lee Si-young, Gu Jungseo and Jeong Hui Seong.

References

External links
  

Poetry organizations
Korean poetry
1987 establishments in South Korea
South Korean writers' organizations